A contingent beneficiary is someone who benefits from a contingent contract; they profit from a promise, which may or may be fulfilled, to do or abstain from doing a certain thing. This matter itself is realized only on the happening of some future uncertain event.

In the context of an insurance policy, the condition is generally the death of the insurance contract holder; the party who benefits is referred to as the primary beneficiary.

References

Wills and trusts
Inheritance